The 1944 Green Bay Packers season was their 26th season overall and their 24th season in the National Football League. The team finished with an 8–2 record under coach Curly Lambeau, earning them a first-place finish in the Western Conference. The Packers ended the season beating the New York Giants 14–7 in the NFL Championship Game, their sixth league title. Don Hutson led the NFL in touchdowns for a record-setting eighth time in his career.

Offseason

NFL draft

Regular season

Schedule

Standings

Roster

Awards, records and honors
 Don Hutson, NFL Leader, Touchdowns
 Don Hutson, NFL Record, Touchdown Leader, Eighth Time

References

 Sportsencyclopedia.com

Green Bay Packers seasons
National Football League championship seasons
Green Bay Packers
Green